Felix John Gilman (born 11 November 1974 in London) is a British writer of fantasy and weird fiction. His 2007 novel Thunderer (published by Bantam Spectra) was nominated for the 2009 Locus Award for Best First Novel, and earned him a nomination for the John W. Campbell Award for Best New Writer in both 2009 and 2010.

Personal life
Gilman lives in New York City, where he practices law.

Bibliography

Novels

References

External links

Official site (archived)
The story behind The Revolutions - Online Essay by Felix Gilman at Upcoming4.me

English fantasy writers
Alumni of the University of Oxford
Harvard Law School alumni
Living people
Steampunk writers
1974 births
English male novelists
English expatriates in the United States
21st-century English lawyers
Weird fiction writers